Andrija Jukic (born 3 January 1987) is an Australian footballer who plays for Western Knights SC.

Club career
He tried out for the FOX8 reality TV show Football Superstar, but narrowly missed out on making the Perth Top 10, placing 11th, After this Jukic signed for his home town club Perth Glory's 2008/09 Youth League team, where he was a standout. He made his senior debut for Perth Glory as a substitute on 21 December 2008 against Sydney FC.

On 26 February 2009, Jukic signed a two-year deal with Perth Glory. Andrija scored his first goal in the A-League and for his club against Central Coast Mariners on 31 January 2010. Andrija was a part of the Perth Glory team that made finals in the A-League for the first time in the club's history during the 2009/10 season.

Honours
Personal honours
 National Youth League Top Scorer: 2008–2009 with Perth Glory –  6 goals

See also
 He is the brother of Queen's Park FC striker Katarina Jukic.

References

External links
 Perth Glory profile

A-League Men players
Australian soccer players
Living people
Perth Glory FC players
NK Junak Sinj players
Expatriate footballers in Indonesia
1987 births
Association football midfielders